Kilonzo is a surname. Notable people with the surname include:

Charles Kilonzo, Kenyan politician
Cleopa Kilonzo Mailu (born c. 1956), Kenyan politician
Felix Kilonzo (born 1990), Kenyan journalist
Kakai Kilonzo (born 1954), Kenyan musician
Kethi Kilonzo (born 1977), Kenyan lawyer
Kiema Kilonzo, Kenyan politician
Mutula Kilonzo (1948-2013), Kenyan politician
Nduku Kilonzo (born 1974), Kenyan businesswoman
Stella Kilonzo (born 1975), Kenyan businesswoman
Stephen Muli Kilonzo(1992), Kenyan technology Mogul